Bertram Obling (born 26 September 1995) is a Danish handball player for HC Erlangen.

Achievements 
 Swedish Handball League
Winner: 2021
 Swedish Handball Cup
Winner: 2022
 Danish Handball Cup
Runner-up: 2018

Individual Awards
 All-Star Team Handbollsligan 2021/2022

References

External links
 Bertram Obling at European Handball Federation

1995 births
Living people
Danish male handball players
Sportspeople from Aarhus
Expatriate handball players
Danish expatriate sportspeople in Sweden
Danish expatriate sportspeople in Germany
Handball-Bundesliga players
IK Sävehof players